Brendan Oake (born 17 September 1985) is an Australian former professional rugby league footballer played for the Parramatta Eels in the National Rugby League.

Background
Oake was born in Sydney, New South Wales, Australia.

Brendan attended Sackville Street Primary School in Ingleburn NSW and St Gregory's College, Campbelltown.

Playing career
Oake made his first grade debut for Parramatta against arch rivals Canterbury-Bankstown in round 1 of the 2008 NRL season which ended in a 28–20 victory at Telstra Stadium.  Oake made a total of 12 appearances in his debut season as the club finished a disappointing 11th on the table.

In June 2008 he resigned with the club until 2010.

In 2009, Oake was limited to only four appearances and did not feature in the club's finals campaign or the 2009 NRL Grand Final.  In the 2010 NRL season, Oake only made six appearances for Parramatta and was released at the end of the season after the club failed to qualify for the finals despite being selected as premiership favorites before the year began.

References

External links
Parramatta Eels profile

1985 births
Living people
Australian rugby league players
Parramatta Eels players
Rugby league locks
Rugby league props
Rugby league second-rows
Rugby league players from Sydney
Wentworthville Magpies players